Minuscule 187 (in the Gregory-Aland numbering), ε 222 (Soden), is a Greek minuscule manuscript of the New Testament, on parchment. Palaeographically it has been assigned to the 12th century. It has marginalia.

Description 

The codex contains a complete text of the four Gospels on 212 thick parchment leaves (size ). The text is written in one column per page, in 25 lines per page, the capital letters in gold.

There is also a division according to the Ammonian Sections (in Mark 237 Sections), (no references to the Eusebian Canons).

A peculiar kind of asterisk occurs very frequently in the text and margin.

Text 

The Greek text of the codex is a representative of the Byzantine text-type. Aland placed it in Category V.
According to the Claremont Profile Method it belongs to the textual family Kx in Luke 1, Luke 10, and Luke 20. It creates textual cluster 187.

Minuscule 218 is close.

History 

The manuscripts was examined and described by Bandini, Birch, Scholz, and Burgon. C. R. Gregory saw it in 1886.

It is currently housed at the Laurentian Library (Plutei. VI. 23), at Florence.

See also 

 List of New Testament minuscules
 Biblical manuscript
 Textual criticism

References

Further reading 

 

Greek New Testament minuscules
12th-century biblical manuscripts